Itziar is a female Basque given name, derived from Our Lady of Itziar, near San Sebastian and the France-Spain border. Notable people with the name include:

Itziar Bakero (born 1969), Spanish footballer
Itziar Esparza (born 1974), Spanish swimmer
Itziar Gurrutxaga (born 1977), Spanish footballer
Itziar Ituño (born 1974), Spanish actress 
Itziar Mendizabal (born 1981), Spanish ballet dancer
Itziar Okariz (born 1965), Spanish artist
Itziar Pinillos (born 2000), Spanish footballer

References

Basque feminine given names
Feminine given names